Uncle Tom and Little Eva is an oil on canvas painted by Edwin Longsden Long in 1866. It depicts a scene from the novel Uncle Tom's Cabin. The painting is kept at Russell-Cotes Art Gallery & Museum.

References

Oil on canvas paintings
1866 paintings
Uncle Tom's Cabin
Paintings by Edwin Long
Slavery in art
Black people in art
Paintings based on literature